William James Dickie (10 April 1869 – 24 June 1921) was a Liberal Party Member of Parliament in New Zealand, and opposition Whip.

Biography

Dickie was one of six children; he was born in Cobden, Westland, on 10 April 1869 to William Dickie (who had arrived in New Zealand in the late 1850s from Menstrie, Scotland) and Mary Dent, who were early settlers to Greymouth.  He farmed  with Arthur Ingham Dent from 1902 in Lyndhurst near Ashburton.

He won the Selwyn electorate in 1911, and again in December 1914.  The electorate was abolished for the 1919 election, and he was defeated in 1919 by William Nosworthy standing for Ashburton.

From 1916 until 1919 he was the Liberal Party's junior whip.

Dickie committed suicide on 24 June 1921 at his farm in Lyndhurst; he died from a gunshot wound to the head. Dickie was buried at the Methven cemetery. He was survived by his wife, three sons, Colin, Deacon and Alan and four daughters Mary Ellen, Margaret, Catherine and Herwini.

Notes

References

1869 births
1921 suicides
New Zealand Liberal Party MPs
New Zealand politicians who committed suicide
Suicides by firearm in New Zealand
New Zealand MPs for South Island electorates
Unsuccessful candidates in the 1919 New Zealand general election
Members of the New Zealand House of Representatives
People from Greymouth